The Battle of Borny–Colombey or the Battle of Colombey-Nouilly took place on 14 August 1870 as part of the Franco-Prussian War. During the battle the escape route of the French army under François Bazaine was blocked when the French encountered the First Army under von Steinmetz. The outcome of the battle itself was indecisive as although the French were able to escape to Metz, they were delayed for 12 hours.

Like most of the early battles of the war, Borny was one that neither side had planned or wanted. For the French, the battle had dire consequences as they neglected to use their numerical superiority to force a passage and it delayed the Army's retreat out of Metz for twelve precious hours. This gave the Prussians the time to bring up their Second army under Prince Frederick Charles and assured that after the battles fought in the following days (Mars-la-Tour and Gravelotte) France's premier army would be trapped at Metz.

Citations

References

Further reading
Hardoin, Georges. Français & Allemands. Histoire anecdotique de la guerre de 1870–1871. Tome V. L'Investissement de Metz. La journée des dupes. Servigny. Noisseville. Flanville. Nouilly. Coincy.
Rédigé par la section historique du grand état-major prussien et traduit par le capitaine Paul Émile Costa de Serda, Supplément cartes de la guerre franco-allemande de 1870–71. Première partie, Histoire de la guerre jusqu'à la chute de l'empire. Premier volume, Du début des hostilités à la bataille de Gravelotte., s.l., 1874.
von Widdern, Georg. Kritische Tage. I. Teil. Die Initiative und die gegenseitige Unterstuetzung in der deutschen Heeres-und Truppenfuerung. Bd. 1. Die I. Armee bei Colombey-Nouilly am 13. u. 14. August 1870, Berlin, 1897.

Battle of Borny-Colombey
Conflicts in 1870
Battles of the Franco-Prussian War
Battles involving Prussia
Battles involving France
Borny-Colombey
History of Moselle (department)
August 1870 events